Theobaldo di Gatti (c.1650-1727) was a composer and musician, born in Florence. He moved from Italy to France after hearing the music of Jean-Baptiste Lully. King Louis XIV made him a naturalised French subject in 1675. In France he was simply known by the name Théobalde.

He earned his living playing the bass viol, both as a teacher and as a member of the orchestra of the Académie Royale de Musique (the Paris Opera). He composed songs, duets and two works for the stage.

Works

Songs
 Recueil d’airs italiens (Paris, 1696)

Stage works
Coronis (pastorale héroïque), premiere 23 March 1691
Scylla, (tragédie en musique). premiere 16 September 1701

References

Sources
Article on Theobaldo di Gatti at CESAR

French Baroque composers
French male classical composers
French opera composers
Male opera composers
1650s births
1727 deaths
Musicians from Florence
Italian emigrants to France
French Baroque viol players
17th-century male musicians